Economic sanctions are commercial and financial penalties applied by one or more countries against a targeted self-governing state, group, or individual. Economic sanctions are not necessarily imposed because of economic circumstances—they may also be imposed for a variety of political, military, and social issues. Economic sanctions can be used for achieving domestic and international purposes.

The efficacy of sanctions is debatable—there are many failures—and sanctions can have unintended consequences. Economic sanctions may include various forms of trade barriers, tariffs, and restrictions on financial transactions. Since the mid-1990s, United Nations Security Council (UNSC) sanctions have tended to target individuals and entities, in contrast to the comprehensive embargoes of earlier decades.

An embargo is similar, but usually implies a more severe sanction. An embargo (from the Spanish embargo, meaning hindrance, obstruction, etc. in a general sense, a trading ban in trade terminology and literally "distraint" in juridic parlance) is the partial or complete prohibition of commerce and trade with a particular country/state or a group of countries. Embargoes are considered strong diplomatic measures imposed in an effort, by the imposing country, to elicit a given national-interest result from the country on which it is imposed. Embargoes are generally considered legal barriers to trade, not to be confused with blockades, which are often considered to be acts of war. Embargoes can mean limiting or banning export or import, creating quotas for quantity, imposing special tolls, taxes, banning freight or transport vehicles, freezing or seizing freights, assets, bank accounts, limiting the transport of particular technologies or products (high-tech) for example CoCom during the Cold War.

In response to embargoes, a closed economy often develops in an area subjected to heavy embargoes. The effectiveness of embargoes is thus in proportion to the extent and degree of international participation. Embargoes can be an opportunity for some countries to develop self-sufficiency.

History of sanctions 
Sanctions in the form of blockades were prominent during World War I. Debates about implementing sanctions through international organizations, such as the League of Nations, became prominent after the end of World War I. The League Covenant permitted the use of sanctions in five cases:

 When Article 10 of the League Covenant is violated
 In case of war or threat of war (Article 11)
 When a League member does not pay an arbitration award (Article 12)
 When a League member goes to war without submitting the dispute to the League Council or League Assembly (Articles 12–15)
 When a non-member goes to war against a League member (Article 17)

The Abyssinia Crisis in 1935 resulted in League sanctions against Mussolini's Italy under Article 16 of the Covenant. Oil supplies, however, were not stopped, nor the Suez Canal closed to Italy, and the conquest proceeded. The sanctions were lifted in 1936 and Italy left the League in 1937.

After World War II, the League was replaced by the more expansive United Nations (UN) in 1945.

Politics of sanctions 
Economic sanctions are used as a tool of foreign policy by many governments. Economic sanctions are usually imposed by a larger country upon a smaller country for one of two reasons: either the latter is a perceived threat to the security of the former nation or that country treats its citizens unfairly. They can be used as a coercive measure for achieving particular policy goals related to trade or for humanitarian violations. Economic sanctions are used as an alternative weapon instead of going to war to achieve desired outcomes.

Effectiveness of economic sanctions
According to a 2015 working paper by Neuenkirch and Neumeier, UN economic sanctions had a statistically significant impact on targeted states by reducing their GDP growth by an average of 2.3%-3.5% per year—and more than 5% per year in the case of comprehensive UN embargoes—with the negative effects typically persisting for a period of ten years. By contrast, unilateral US sanctions had a considerably smaller impact on GDP growth, restricting it by 0.5%-0.9% per year, with an average duration of seven years.

Imposing sanctions on an opponent also affects the economy of the imposing country to a degree. If import restrictions are promulgated, consumers in the imposing country may have restricted choices of goods. If export restrictions are imposed or if sanctions prohibit companies in the imposing country from trading with the target country, the imposing country may lose markets and investment opportunities to competing countries.

Hufbauer, Schott, and Elliot (2008) argue that regime change is the most frequent foreign-policy objective of economic sanctions, accounting for just over 39 percent of cases of their imposition. Hufbauer et al. claimed that in their studies, 34 percent of the cases studied were successful. When Robert A. Pape examined their study, he claimed that only 5 of their reported 40 successes were actually effective, reducing the success rate to 4%. In either case, the difficulty and unexpected nuances of measuring the actual success of sanctions in relation to their goals are both increasingly apparent and still under debate. In other words, it is difficult to determine why a regime or country changes (i.e., if it was the sanction or inherent instability) and doubly so to measure the full political effect of a given action.

Offering an explanation as to why sanctions are still imposed even when they may be marginally effective, British diplomat Jeremy Greenstock suggests sanctions are popular not because they are known to be effective, but because "there is nothing else [to do] between words and military action if you want to bring pressure upon a government". Critics of sanctions like Belgian jurist Marc Bossuyt argue that in nondemocratic regimes, the extent to which this affects political outcomes is contested, because by definition such regimes do not respond as strongly to the popular will.

A strong connection has been found between the effectiveness of sanctions and the size of veto players in a government. Veto players represent individual or collective actors whose agreement is required for a change of the status quo, for example parties in a coalition, or the legislature's check on presidential powers. When sanctions are imposed on a country, it can try to mitigate them by adjusting its economic policy. The size of the veto players determines how many constraints the government will face when trying to change status quo policies, and the larger the size of the veto players, the more difficult it is to find support for new policies, thus making the sanctions more effective.

Francesco Giumelli writes that the "set of sanctions ... that many observers would be likely to consider the most persuasive (and effective)," namely UN sanctions against "central bank assets and sovereign wealth funds," are "of all the types of measures applied ... the one least frequently used." Giumelli also distinguishes between sanctions against international terrorists, in which "the nature of the request is not as important as the constraining aspect," and sanctions imposed in connection with "post-conflict scenarios", which should "include flexible demands and the potential for adaptation if the situation changes".

Criticism
Sanctions have been criticized on humanitarian grounds, as they negatively impact a nation's economy and can also cause collateral damage on ordinary citizens. Peksen implies that sanctions can degenerate human rights in the target country. Some policy analysts believe imposing trade restrictions only serves to hurt ordinary people as opposed to government elites, and others have likened the practice to siege warfare. The United Nations Security Council (UNSC) has generally refrained from imposing comprehensive sanctions since the mid-1990s, in part due to the controversy over the efficacy and civilian harms attributed to the Sanctions against Iraq.

Implications for businesses
There is an importance, especially with relation to financial loss, for companies to be aware of embargoes that apply to their intended export or import destinations. Properly preparing products for trade, sometimes referred to as an embargo check, is a difficult and timely process for both importers and exporters.

There are many steps that must be taken to ensure that a business entity does not accrue unwanted fines, taxes, or other punitive measures. Common examples of embargo checks include referencing embargo lists, cancelling transactions, and ensuring the validity of a trade entity.

This process can become very complicated, especially for countries with changing embargoes. Before better tools became available, many companies relied on spreadsheets and manual processes to keep track of compliance issues. Today, there are software based solutions that automatically handle sanctions and other complications with trade.

Examples

United States sanctions

US Embargo Act of 1807

The United States Embargo of 1807 involved a series of laws passed by the US Congress (1806–1808) during the second term of President Thomas Jefferson. Britain and France were engaged in the War of the Fourth Coalition; the US wanted to remain neutral and to trade with both sides, but both countries objected to American trade with the other. American policy aimed to use the new laws to avoid war and to force both France and Britain to respect American rights. The embargo failed to achieve its aims, and Jefferson repealed the legislation in March 1809.

US embargo of Cuba

The United States embargo against Cuba began on March 14, 1958, during the overthrow of dictator Fulgencio Batista by Fidel Castro during the Cuban Revolution. At first, the embargo applied only to arms sales, however it later expanded to include other imports, eventually extending to almost all trade on February 7, 1962. Referred to by Cuba as "el bloqueo" (the blockade), the US embargo on Cuba remains  one of the longest-standing embargoes in modern history. Few of the United States' allies embraced the embargo, and many have argued it has been ineffective in changing Cuban government behavior. While taking some steps to allow limited economic exchanges with Cuba, American President Barack Obama nevertheless reaffirmed the policy in 2011, stating that without the granting of improved human rights and freedoms by Cuba's current government, the embargo remains "in the national interest of the United States".

Other countries

Russian sanctions 
Russia has been known to utilize economic sanctions to achieve its political goals. Russia's focus has been primarily on implementing sanctions against the pro-Western governments of former Soviet Union states. The Kremlin's aim is particularly on states that aspire to join the European Union and NATO, such as Ukraine, Moldova, and Georgia. Russia has enacted a law, the Dima Yakovlev Law, that defines sanctions against US citizens involved in "violations of the human rights and freedoms of Russian citizens". It lists US citizens who are banned from entering Russia.

Russia sanctions on Ukraine 

Viktor Yushchenko, the third president of Ukraine who was elected in 2004, lobbied during his term to gain admission to NATO and the EU. Soon after Yushchenko entered office, Russia demanded Kyiv pay the same rate that it charged Western European states. This quadrupled Ukraine's energy bill overnight. Russia subsequently cut off the supply of natural gas in 2006, causing significant harm to the Ukrainian and Russian economies. As the Ukrainian economy began to struggle, Yushchenko's approval ratings dropped significantly; reaching the single digits by the 2010 election; Viktor Yanukovych, who was more supportive of Moscow won the election in 2010 to become the fourth president of Ukraine. After his election, gas prices were reduced substantially.

Russian sanctions on Georgia 
The Rose Revolution in Georgia brought Mikheil Saakashvili to power as the third president of the country. Saakashvili wanted to bring Georgia into NATO and the EU and was a strong  supporter of the US-led war in Iraq and Afghanistan. Russia would soon implement a number of different sanctions on Georgia, including natural gas price raises through Gazprom and wider trade sanctions that impacted the Georgian economy, particularly Georgian exports of wine, citrus fruits, and mineral water. In 2006, Russia banned all imports from Georgia which was able to deal a significant blow to the Georgian economy. Russia also expelled nearly 2,300 Georgians who worked within its borders.

United Nations sanctions
The United Nations issues sanctions by consent of the United Nations Security Council (UNSC) and/or General Assembly in response to major international events, receiving authority to do so under Article 41 of Chapter VII of the United Nations Charter. The nature of these sanctions may vary, and include financial, trade, or weaponry restrictions. Motivations can also vary, ranging from humanitarian and environmental concerns to efforts to halt nuclear proliferation. Over two dozen sanctions measures have been implemented by the United Nations since its founding in 1945.

Most UNSC sanctions since the mid-1990s have targeted individuals and entities rather than entire governments, a change from the comprehensive trade sanctions of earlier decades. For example, the UNSC maintains lists of individuals indicted for crimes or linked to international terrorism, which raises novel legal questions regarding due process. According to a dataset covering the years 1991 to 2013, 95% of UNSC sanction regimes included "sectoral bans" on aviation and/or the import (or export) of arms or raw materials, 75% included "individual/group" sanctions such as asset freezes or restrictions on travel, and just 10% targeted national finances or included measures against central banks, sovereign wealth funds, or foreign investment. The most frequently used UNSC sanction documented in the dataset is an embargo against imported weapons, which applied in 87% of all cases and was directed against non-state actors more often than against governments. Targeted sanctions regimes may contain hundreds of names, a handful, or none at all.

Sanctions on Somalia, 1992 

The UN implemented sanctions against Somalia beginning in April 1992, after the overthrow of the Siad Barre regime in 1991 during the Somali Civil War. UNSC Resolution 751 forbade members to sell, finance, or transfer any military equipment to Somalia.

Sanctions on North Korea, 2006 

The UNSC passed Resolution 1718 in 2006 in response to a nuclear test that the Democratic People's Republic of Korea (DPRK) conducted in violation of the Treaty on Non-Proliferation of Nuclear Weapons. The resolution banned the sale of military and luxury goods and froze government assets. Since then, the UN has passed multiple resolutions subsequently expanding sanctions on North Korea. Resolution 2270 from 2016 placed restrictions on transport personnel and vehicles employed by North Korea while also restricting the sale of natural resources and fuel for aircraft.

The efficacy of such sanctions has been questioned in light of continued nuclear tests by North Korea in the decade following the 2006 resolution. Professor William Brown of Georgetown University argued that "sanctions don't have much of an impact on an economy that has been essentially bankrupt for a generation".

Sanctions on Libya 
On February 26, 2011, the UNSC issued an arms embargo against the Libya through Security Council Resolution 1970 in response to humanitarian abuses occurring in the First Libyan Civil War. The embargo was later extended to mid-2018. Under the embargo, Libya has suffered severe inflation because of increased dependence on the private sector to import goods. The sanctions caused large cuts to health and education, which caused social conditions to decrease. Even though the sanctions were in response to human rights, their effects were limited.

Sanctions on apartheid South Africa

In effort to punish South Africa for its policies of apartheid, the United Nations General Assembly adopted a voluntary international oil-embargo against South Africa on November 20, 1987; that embargo had the support of 130 countries. South Africa, in response, expanded its Sasol production of synthetic crude.

All United Nations sanctions on South Africa ended over the Negotiations to end Apartheid, Resolution 919 and the 1994 South African elections, in which Nelson Mandela was elected as the first post-Apartheid president.

Other multilateral sanctions
One of the most comprehensive attempts at an embargo occurred during the Napoleonic Wars of 1803–1815. Aiming to cripple the United Kingdom economically, Emperor Napoleon I of France in 1806 promulgated the Continental System—which forbade European nations from trading with the UK. In practice the French Empire could not completely enforce the embargo, which proved as harmful (if not more so) to the continental nations involved as to the British.

The United States, Britain, the Republic of China and the Netherlands imposed sanctions against Japan in 1940–1941 in response to its expansionism. Deprived of access to vital oil, iron-ore and steel supplies, Japan started planning for military action to seize the resource-rich Dutch East Indies, which required a preemptive attack on Pearl Harbor, triggering the American entry into the Pacific War.

In 1973–1974, OAPEC instigated the 1973 oil crisis through its oil embargo against the United States and other industrialized nations that supported Israel in the Yom Kippur War. The results included a sharp rise in oil prices and in OPEC revenues, an emergency period of energy rationing, a global economic recession, large-scale conservation efforts, and long-lasting shifts toward natural gas, ethanol, nuclear and other alternative energy sources. Israel continued to receive Western support, however.

Current sanctions

By targeted country
List of sanctioned countries (the below is not an exhaustive list):
Afghanistan sanctions by the US
China by the EU and the US. Sanctions made on arms embargo, enacted in response to the Tiananmen Square protests of 1989 
European Union arms embargo on the People's Republic of China
 Hong Kong, enacted in response to the National Security Law
Cuban embargoes by the US. It covers arms, consumer goods and financial assets, enacted in 1958
EU, US, Australia, Canada and Norway by Russia since August 2014 on beef, pork, fruit and vegetable produce, poultry, fish, cheese, milk and dairy items. On August 13, 2015, the embargo was expanded to include Albania, Montenegro, Iceland, and Liechtenstein
Gaza Strip by Israel since 2001, under arms blockade since 2007 due to the large number of illicit arms traffic used to wage war
Indonesia by Australia on live cattle due to the alleged cruel slaughter methods in Indonesia
 Iran sanctions by the US and its allies, notably by barring nuclear, missile and many military exports to Iran and target investments in: oil, gas and petrochemicals, exports of refined petroleum products, banks, insurance, financial institutions, and shipping. Enacted 1979, increased through the following years and reached its tightest point in 2010. In April 2019 the US threatened to sanction countries that continued to buy oil from Iran after an initial six-month waiver announced in November 2018 had expired. According to the BBC, US sanctions against Iran "have led to a sharp downturn in Iran's economy, pushing the value of its currency to record lows, quadrupling its annual inflation rate, driving away foreign investors, and triggering protests". These sanctions have taken a toll on humanitarian concerns.
 Mali by the UNSC in relation to the spiraling security situation and hostilities in breach of the Agreement on Peace and Reconciliation in 2017
 Myanmar sanctions by the EU. Sanctions were imposed against Myanmar due to the worsening state of democracy and human rights infringements
 Nicaragua by the UK. Sanctions imposed in 2020 to push the government to respect democratic principles and legal institutions
 North Korean sanctions: 
international sanctions imposed on North Korea since the Korean War of 1950–1953 eased under the Sunshine Policy of South Korean President Kim Dae Jung and of US President Bill Clinton. but tightened again in 2010
by the UN, US and EU on luxury goods (and arms) enacted 2006
United Nations Security Council Resolution 1718 (2006) – a reaction to the DPRK's claim of a nuclear test
Russian sanctions:
 by the US. On 2 August 2017, President Donald Trump signed into law the Countering America's Adversaries Through Sanctions Act that grouped together sanctions against Russia, Iran and North Korea 
 by the EU. In March 2021, Reuters reported that the EU has placed immediate sanctions on both Chechnya and Russia—due to ongoing government sponsored and backed violence against LGBTIQ+ individuals
 international sanctions was also implemented in response to the Russo-Ukrainian War that started in 2014 
 International sanctions during the 2022 Russian invasion of Ukraine 
 Somalian arms embargo by the UN and sanctions by the UK
Sudan by the US in 1997
Syrian sanctions by the EU and the US on arms and imports of oil
Turkish Republic of Northern Cyprus embargo by the UN on consumer goods, enacted since 1994
Venezuelan sanctions by the US and its allies since 2015. An arms embargo and the selling of assets were banned due to human rights violations, high government corruption, links with drug cartels and electoral rigging in the 2018 Venezuelan presidential elections. Sanctions imposed by Canada since 2017, and since 2018 by Mexico, Panama and Switzerland

By targeted individuals
 List of individuals sanctioned during the Venezuelan crisis
 List of people and organizations sanctioned during the Russo-Ukrainian War
 List of people and organizations sanctioned in relation to human rights violations in Belarus
 United Nations sanction imposed by UN Security Council Resolution 1267 in 1999 against all Al-Qaida- and Taliban-associated individuals. The cornerstone of the sanction is a consolidated list of persons maintained by the Security Council. All nations are obliged to freeze bank accounts and other financial instruments controlled by or used for the benefit of anyone on the list.

By sanctioning country or organization
 Australia currently sanctions 9 countries
 India sanctions
 United Kingdom currently has sanctions on 27 countries
 United Nations has since 1966 established 30 sanctions regimes to countries (such as Southern Rhodesia, South Africa, Yugoslavia and more) and to organizations (such as ISIL, al-Qaida and the Taliban)
 United States sanctions and United States embargoes
 2002 United States steel tariff was placed by the United States on steel to protect its industry from foreign producers such as China and Russia. The World Trade Organization ruled that the tariffs were illegal. The European Union threatened retaliatory tariffs on a range of US goods that would mainly affect swing states. The US government then removed the steel tariffs in early 2004.

By targeted activity
 In response to cyber-attacks on April 1, 2015, President Obama issued an Executive Order establishing the first-ever economic sanctions. The Executive Order was intended to impact individuals and entities ("designees") responsible for cyber-attacks that threaten the national security, foreign policy, economic health, or financial stability of the US. Specifically, the Executive Order authorized the Treasury Department to freeze designees— assets. The European Union implemented their first targeted financial sanctions regarding cyber activity in 2020.
 In response to intelligence analysis alleging Russian hacking and interference with the 2016 US elections, President Obama expanded presidential authority to sanction in response to cyber activity that threatens democratic elections. Given that the original order was intended to protect critical infrastructure, it can be argued that the election process should have been included in the original order.

Bilateral trade disputes
 Vietnam as a result of capitalist influences over the 1990s and having imposed sanctions against Cambodia, is accepting of sanctions disposed with accountability.
 Brazil introduced sanctions against the US in March 2010. These sanctions were placed because the US government was paying cotton farmers for their products against World Trade Organization rules. The sanctions cover cotton, as well as cars, chewing gum, fruit, and vegetable products. The WTO is currently supervising talks between the states to remove the sanctions.

Former sanctions
 Comecon nations (CoCom export controls) by the Western bloc
 Georgian and Moldovan import ban by Russia on agricultural products, wine and mineral water (2006–2013)
 Iraqi sanctions by the US (1990–2003)
 Israeli boycott by Arab nations
 Italy by the League of Nations in 1935 after the Italian invasion of Abyssinia
 Japan (ABCD line) by the US, UK, China and the Netherlands in 1940 to discourage militarism
 Libya by the UN in 2011 due to mass killings of Libyan protesters/rebels. Ended in 2012 after the overthrow and execution of Gaddafi
India by the UK due to nuclear exports restriction
Macedonia total trade embargo by Greece (1994–1995)
Mali total embargo by ECOWAS in 2012 to force the junta to return power to the civilian government and re-install the National constitution
Nicaraguan embargo by the US
North Vietnam (and then unified Vietnam) trade embargo by the US (1964–1994)
Pakistan by the UK in 2002 on nuclear export restrictions
 Palestinian National Authority sanctions by Israel, US and other countries (2006–2007)
 Qatar by Saudi Arabia, United Arab Emirates, Bahrain, and Egypt due to Qatar's alleged support for terrorist organizations (2017–2021)
 South African sanctions by the international community during Apartheid (see also disinvestment from South Africa)
Serbia by Kosovo's unilaterally declared government in 2011
Yugoslavian sanctions by the UN in response to the Bosnian War (1992–2001)
Embargo Act of 1807

See also

Arms embargo
Boycott
Economic freedom
Economic warfare
 Globalization
International political economy
International sanctions
Magnitsky legislation
Political economy
 Specially Designated National
Trade war

References

Further reading
 Ashouri, Mahan "The Role of  transnational Private  Actors in Ukrain International Flight 752 Crash  in Iran Under Economic Sanctions Pressure" (2021) 
 Brzoska, Michael. "International sanctions before and beyond UN sanctions." International Affairs 91.6 (2015): 1339–1349.
 Caruso, Raul. "The impact of international economic sanctions on trade: An empirical analysis." Peace Economics, Peace Science and Public Policy 9.2 (2003) online.
 Cortright, David, et al. The sanctions decade: Assessing UN strategies in the 1990s (Lynne Rienner Publishers, 2000).
 Doxey, Margaret P. International sanctions in contemporary perspective (1987) online
 Doxey, Margaret. "International sanctions: a framework for analysis with special reference to the UN and Southern Africa." International organization 26.3 (1972): 527–550.
 Doxey, Margaret. "International sanctions in theory and practice." Case Western Reserve Journal of International Law 15 (1983): 273+. online
 Drezner, Daniel W. The Sanctions Paradox. (Cambridge University Press, 1999)
 Escribà-Folch, Abel, and Joseph Wright. "Dealing with tyranny: International sanctions and the survival of authoritarian rulers." International studies quarterly 54.2 (2010): 335–359. online
 Farrall, Jeremy Matam. United Nations sanctions and the rule of law (Cambridge University Press, 2007). online
 Hufbauer, Gary C. Economic sanctions and American diplomacy (Council on Foreign Relations, 1998) online.
 Hufbauer, Gary C., Jeffrey J. Schott, and Kimberley Ann Elliott.  Economic Sanctions Reconsidered: History and Current Policy (Washington DC: Peterson Institute for International Economics, 1990)
 Kaempfer, William H. International economic sanctions: a public choice perspective (1992) online
 Köchler, Hans. The United Nations sanctions policy & international law (1995) online
 Mulder, Nicholas. The Economic Weapon: The Rise of Sanctions as a Tool of Modern War (2022) excerpt also see online review
 Nossal, Kim Richard. "International sanctions as international punishment." International Organization 43.2 (1989): 301–322.
 Royal Institute of International Affairs. International Sanctions (1935).

External links
 Business and Sanctions Consulting Network: List of Countries
 The Global Sanctions Data Base (GSDB)
Threat and Imposition of Economic Sanctions (TIES) Dataset
The International Sanctions Termination (IST) dataset
 Online Books

International sanctions
Non-tariff barriers to trade
Embargoes